is a passenger railway station located in Kita-ku of the city of Okayama, Okayama Prefecture, Japan. It is operated by West Japan Railway Company (JR West).

Lines

Station layout
The station consists of one ground-level island platform connected to the station building by a footbridge.The station is unattended.

Platforms

Adjacent stations

History
Hōkaiin Station opened on June 10, 1908 as a temporary stop and was upgraded to a full station on September 2 of the same year.  With the privatization of the Japan National Railways (JNR) on April 1, 1987, the station came under the aegis of the West Japan Railway Company.

Passenger statistics
In fiscal 2019, the station was used by an average of 1307 passengers daily..

Surrounding area
The station is located in a dense residential area.
 Okayama Municipal Mino Elementary School
 Okayama Prefectural General Ground (City Light Stadium, Okayama Baseball Stadium, Momotaro Arena, Tsushima Ruins)
 Okayama University Tsushima Campus/The Open University of Japan Okayama Study Center
 Okayama Municipal Okakita Junior High School

See also
List of railway stations in Japan

References

External links

 Hōkaiin Station Official Site

Railway stations in Okayama
Tsuyama Line
Railway stations in Japan opened in 1908